Antoine Pugliesi-Conti (1827–1908) was a French administrator who was Prefect of Vendée during the Second Empire.

He is born on 4 October 1827 in Ajaccio, Corsica, and died on 10 February 1908 in the same city.

Family 

As his father-in-law had no male heirs, Antoine Pugliesi became Antoine Pugliesi-Conti by adding Conti to his name by décret impérial (imperial decree) of 25 January 1867.

His children were:
 (1861–1933) député (deputy) of Seine,
 (1863–1926) député (deputy) of Corsica,
  (1866–1936), Vice-admiral.

Career 
Conseiller de préfecture (i. e. member of a ) of Ardennes in Mézières City now part of Charleville-Mézières City (1860).
Sub-prefect of Saint-Pons (former  suppressed in 1926) in Saint-Pons City now Saint-Pons-de-Thomières City, Hérault (1861).
Secretary General of Loiret, in Orléans City (1865).
Sub-prefect of Louviers (former  suppressed in 1926) in Louviers City, Eure (1865).
Sub-prefect of Boulogne-sur-Mer, in Boulogne-sur-Mer City, Pas-de-Calais (1866).
Prefect of Vendée in Napoléon-Vendée City now La Roche-sur-Yon City (1869).

Sources, Notes, References
 "Pugliesi-Conti (Antoine, François)" (1827–1908), page 593 in Archives nationales (France) (répertoire nominatif par Christiane Lamoussière, revu et complété par Patrick Laharie ; répertoire territorial et introduction par Patrick Laharie), Le Personnel de l’administration préfectorale, 1800–1880, Paris : Centre historique des Archives nationales, 1998, 1159 pages, 27 cm, .

1827 births
People from Ajaccio
1908 deaths
Prefects of France
Prefects of Vendée